is a Japanese athlete who specializes in sprints. She is the country's third fastest ever runner over 100 metres, behind Chisato Fukushima and Momoko Takahashi. She won 4 Japan Championships titles between 2019 and 2021, 2 for 100 metres and 2 for 200 metres.

She also represents Japan in many international relay events such as the 2019 and 2021 World Athletics Relays. She also competed in the women's 4 × 100 metres relay event at the 2020 Summer Olympics. She is a joint holder of the Japanese records in the 4x200 metres relay.

References

External links

1999 births
Living people
Japanese female sprinters
Athletes (track and field) at the 2020 Summer Olympics
Olympic athletes of Japan
Sportspeople from Ōita Prefecture
20th-century Japanese women
21st-century Japanese women